The Dreyfus Affair, also known as Dreyfus Court-Martial, is an 1899 series of eleven short silent films by Georges Méliès. Each of the eleven one-minute installments reconstructs an event from the real-life Dreyfus affair, which was still in progress while the series was being made. The series follows the case from Alfred Dreyfus's arrest on suspicion of espionage, through his imprisonments on Devil's Island and in Rennes, to his trial and conviction for treason; related events are also included, including the suicide of a main Dreyfus accuser, an unknown gunman's attempt to murder Dreyfus's attorney, and a public conflict between pro- and anti-Dreyfus factions. The series was acted in a restrained, realistic style vastly unlike Méliès's better-known fantasy films; the scenes were staged and advertised to suggest accurately that Dreyfus was innocent of espionage and had been framed.

The real-life Dreyfus Affair attracted immense attention both in France and in Britain, and numerous films were made in both countries about the case. Méliès's version was highly publicized, and later recollections and legends claim that it caused considerable interest and controversy at the time. It remains the most famous example of Méliès's staged reconstructions of current events ("reconstructed actualities"), and nine of the eleven installments are known with certainty to survive.

Summary

The eleven installments of the series follow the events of the Dreyfus affair from 1894 through September 1899, the month of the series' release. The following is a summary of the series's overarching storyline. For information on the individual installments, see the Installments section below.

In 1894, Armand du Paty de Clam suspects the French military captain Alfred Dreyfus of being a spy for Germany. Paty de Clam demands a sample of Dreyfus's handwriting, to see if it matches the writing on the Bordereau (an anonymous letter to the German Embassy that has been discovered by French counterintelligence). Finding that Dreyfus seems nervous, Paty de Clam accuses him outright of having written the Bordereau, and offers a gun so that Dreyfus can commit suicide on the spot. Dreyfus protests that he is innocent, and is arrested. At the École Militaire, Dreyfus is stripped of his rank and honors, and he is sent to be clapped in irons in prison on Devil's Island.

Four years later, Colonel Hubert-Joseph Henry, who had accused Dreyfus publicly, is arrested (he has admitted to having forged the Faux Henry, a false document designed to act as evidence against Dreyfus). Henry commits suicide in Cherche-Midi prison. The next year, in 1899, Dreyfus is transferred from Devil's Island via Quiberon to Rennes, where he will be tried by court-martial now that further evidence has surfaced. His defense attorneys Fernand Labori and Edgar Demange visit him, as does his wife Lucie. Later, when walking with Georges Picquart, Labori is struck down by a bullet. Labori survives, but the shooter escapes.

The case splits popular opinion into two sides: the Dreyfusards (who believe Dreyfus is innocent) and the anti-Dreyfusards (who believe he is guilty).  The court martial is heavily attended by journalists on both sides, and a fight breaks out as controversy rages between the Dreyfusard reporter Caroline Rémy de Guebhard and the anti-Dreyfusard reporter Arthur Meyer. The turmoil is hardly more contained in the trial itself, when Dreyfus and General Auguste Mercier (called as a witness) are cross-examined. Dreyfus, convicted of treason, is led back to prison.

Installments
The table below gives each installment's chronological order (#), numbering in Star Film catalogs (SFC), English release titles for the US and UK,  original French title, and length in meters (m), as well as the individual scene summaries from the catalog released on 1 November 1899 by the Warwick Trading Company, the only known British firm to sell all eleven installments of the series.

Production
[[File:Georges Méliès as Fernand Labori.png|thumb|300px|Méliès (left) as Labori, with the actors playing Dreyfus and Demange, in Dreyfus Meets His Wife at Rennes]]
The French public paid intense attention to the Dreyfus affair, with high interest in films relating to the case. One story goes that Francis Doublier, a filmmaker working for the Lumière brothers, went so far in 1898 as to string together unconnected film clips, presenting the melange with a running spoken commentary claiming that he was showing Dreyfus, the courthouse where he was sentenced to Devil's Island, and the ship carrying him there. The hoax was revealed when one audience member pointed out that the events supposedly on view had happened in 1894 and early 1895, before motion-picture film was in use. The French branch of the Biograph Company captured short clips of newsreel footage of the trial at Rennes, while its English counterpart released two fictional films inspired by the affair. Méliès's version of The Dreyfus Affair may have been commissioned by the Warwick Trading Company, which distributed Méliès's films to British projectionists. At about the same time as Méliès's production, the studio Pathé Frères also produced a reenactment of the Dreyfus affair, in six episodes, with the actor Jean Liézer as Dreyfus. This version may have been directed by Ferdinand Zecca.

Production of Méliès's The Dreyfus Affair began while the real-life Alfred Dreyfus's trial was proceeding in Rennes. The series was made entirely in Méliès's Star Films studio in Montreuil, Seine-Saint-Denis, though with a strong emphasis on cinematic realism markedly different from the energetic theatrical style used in Méliès's better-known fantasy films. The series is an elaborate example of Méliès's actualitiés reconstituées ("reconstructed actualities"), films in which current events were recreated in an evocative docudrama-like format.

An ironworker with a strong resemblance to Dreyfus was hired for the role in order to increase the series's realism. Méliès himself appears in the series as Dreyfus's attorney Fernand Labori and makes a brief reappearance as a journalist after Labori's attempted assassination. At least one scene, Dreyfus's exit from the courthouse, appears to have been modelled on a news photograph printed in the journal L'Illustration. Méliès drew on both cinematic and theatrical special effects for the series: the lightning in Landing of Dreyfus at Quiberon was added to the scene using multiple exposure, while the rain and rocking motion of the boat were created with stage machinery. The gun smoke in The Attempt Against the Life of Maitre Labori is a puff of poudre de riz, a cosmetic powder.

Taken as a whole, The Dreyfus Affair can be considered Méliès's longest film up to that date, and it has sometimes been described as such. However, the eleven installments were designed to be sold individually, so it is more accurate to refer to The Dreyfus Affair as a series. (Méliès himself, in recollections late in life, was inconsistent on the point: he once referred to The Dreyfus Affair as a film, but also once said his first long-format film was Cinderella, made later the same year.)

ThemesThe Dreyfus Affair portrays Dreyfus sympathetically, and the lead actor's performance is staged to imply strongly that Dreyfus is innocent. Méliès's casting of himself as Labori has also been taken as an implied support of Dreyfus's cause. In recollections written late in life, Méliès claimed that he had intended to create an objective, nonpartisan illustration of the events of the case. However, the English-language description of the series, which may have been written by Méliès, describes the degradation ceremony as the "first act of injustice to Dreyfus", and a surviving English advertisement for the Devil's Island installment announces that the film shows Dreyfus as a martyr.

Images of characters reading and writing are pervasive throughout the series, serving as a constant reminder of the importance of various documents to the Dreyfus affair. In her book-length study of Méliès, the film scholar Elizabeth Ezra suggests that the writerly imagery also points to "film's potential to be a new form of document", a self-reflexive comment on the filming process itself. Ezra also highlights uses of thematic imagery such as the courtroom's prominent crucifix, a "stigma evoking at once Dreyfus's similarity to the Christian icon through a shared martyrdom, and his alienation from Christianity, through his Jewish heritage."

Release and reception

The series was sold by Méliès's Star Film Company and numbered 206–217 in its catalogs. The eleven installments were sold at  each, and were sometimes shown in sequence, making The Dreyfus Affair the first known film serial. Both Méliès's and Pathé's versions reached England in September 1899, where they quickly became the most extensively advertised films of that year (the record was broken the following month with the release of films of the Transvaal War). According to the film historian Jay Leyda, Méliès's emphasis on realism was so convincing that European audiences believed they were watching actual documentary film of the events.

In a 1930 article for the Paris magazine L'Œuvre, Lucien Wahl recollected that The Dreyfus Affair had caused riotous reactions in France, with Dreyfusards and anti-Dreyfusards arguing noisily during screenings. In a published response, Méliès himself agreed that the scenes had caused riots, and added that the violent responses had led to the French government banning the series. Though these details were quickly taken up by film historians and reprinted, there is no evidence that the series was banned immediately on a national level; Méliès continued to sell it in his catalogues until 1906, seven years later. Similarly, no known French newspapers of the time reported on riots occurring when the series was screened. However, it is possible that some local French officials and exhibitors held a moratorium on Dreyfus-related films due to their controversial nature, as some British cinema owners are known to have done. In addition, the French government did legislate in 1915 to forbid all films relating to Dreyfus, including foreign imports, and did not lift this ban until 1950.

Nine of the eleven installments (all except scenes 2 and 11, catalog numbers 216 and 217) survive as a 35mm positive print at the BFI National Archive. All eleven installments of the series are listed as surviving at the Centre national de la cinématographie in Bois d'Arcy.The Dreyfus Affair remains the most famous of Méliès's reconstructed actualities, surpassing even his highly successful 1902 work in the genre, The Coronation of Edward VII. The film historian Georges Sadoul believed The Dreyfus Affair to be the first "politically engaged film" in the history of cinema. In a study of the Dreyfus affair, the cultural historian Venita Datta comments appreciatively on the dramatic power of Méliès's series, with the combat between Dreyfusard and anti-Dreyfusard journalists "brilliantly played up". The series is prominently featured in Susan Daitch's 2001 novel Paper Conspiracies'', which includes fictionalized accounts of its making, preservation, and survival.

Notes

Footnotes

References

Citations

External links

1899 films
French silent short films
French black-and-white films
Films directed by Georges Méliès
Films about the Dreyfus affair
Articles containing video clips
Cultural depictions of Alfred Dreyfus
1890s drama films
French drama films
1890s documentary films
French documentary films
Silent drama films